The following is a list of Michigan State Historic Sites in Hillsdale County, Michigan. Sites marked with a dagger (†) are also listed on the National Register of Historic Places in Hillsdale County, Michigan.


Current listings

See also
 National Register of Historic Places listings in Hillsdale County, Michigan

Sources
 Historic Sites Online – Hillsdale County. Michigan State Housing Developmental Authority. Accessed January 23, 2011.

References

Hillsdale County
State Historic Sites
Tourist attractions in Hillsdale County, Michigan